Mongolia made its Paralympic début at the 2000 Summer Paralympics in Sydney. The country was represented by two athletes competing in two sports, and did not win any medals.

Competitors

Archery
 men's individual standing: Dambadondogiin Baatarjav

Athletics
 men's 1500m T12: Jambal Lhkagvajav
 men's 5000m T12: Jambal Lhkagvajav
 men's marathon T12: Jambal Lhkagvajav

See also
Mongolia at the Paralympics
Mongolia at the 2000 Summer Olympics

References

External links
International Paralympic Committee

Nations at the 2000 Summer Paralympics
2000
Summer Paralympics